The 2013–14 OFC Champions League was the 13th edition of the Oceanian Club Championship, Oceania's premier club football tournament organized by the Oceania Football Confederation (OFC), and the 8th season under the current OFC Champions League name.

Auckland City became the first team to win four consecutive and six overall titles after defeating Amicale in the final. As the winner of the 2014 OFC Champions League, they earned the right to represent the OFC at the 2014 FIFA Club World Cup. Both finalists also earned invitations to participate in the 2014 OFC President's Cup.

Format change

The OFC decided to change the format once again for the 2014 edition:
The competition consisted of two stages – preliminary stage and final stage (group stage, semi-finals, and final).
For the preliminary stage, like in the previous season, four teams from the four weakest associations took part in this stage, with the tournament played in round-robin format at a single venue. From this season, the preliminary stage winner was granted direct qualification to the group stage.
For the group stage, 12 teams took part in this stage (increase from 8 teams in the past), and more importantly, it was played in a single country. Four associations were awarded two berths each, three associations were awarded one berth each, and one berth was given to the preliminary stage winner. The 12 teams were divided into three groups of four teams (teams from the same association may not be placed into the same group), where each group was played in round-robin format, with the group winners and the best runner-up progressing to the semi-finals.
For the semi-finals, like in the previous season, the two ties were played in home-and-away format over two legs.
For the final, the OFC Executive Committee decided that it was played in home-and-away format over two legs, instead of over one match at a pre-determined venue like in the previous season.

Teams
A total of 15 teams from all 11 OFC associations entered the competition. The four associations with the best results in the 2012–13 OFC Champions League (Fiji, New Zealand, Tahiti, Vanuatu) were awarded two berths each, and three other associations (New Caledonia, Papua New Guinea, Solomon Islands) were awarded one berth each. Those teams directly entered the group stage, to be joined by the winner of the preliminary stage, which was contested by teams from the four developing associations (American Samoa, Cook Islands, Samoa, Tonga).

Schedule
The schedule of the competition was as follows.

Preliminary stage
The preliminary stage was played in Pago Pago, American Samoa from 15 to 19 October 2013 (all times UTC−11). The draw to determine the fixtures was held on 8 October 2013 at the OFC Headquarters in Auckland, New Zealand. The four teams played each other on a round-robin basis. The group winner advanced to the group stage to join the 11 automatic qualifiers.

Group stage
The group stage was played in Ba and Lautoka, Fiji from 7 to 15 April 2014 (all times UTC+12). The 12 teams were divided into three groups of four, with the restriction that teams from the same association not be placed into the same group. The draw to determine the fixtures was held on 7 February 2014 at the OFC Headquarters in Auckland, New Zealand. In each group, the four teams played each other on a round-robin basis. The group winners and the best runner-up advanced to the semi-finals.

Group A

Group B

Group B matches were originally scheduled to be played in Prince Charles Park, Nadi, but the venue was withdrawn after inspection by the OFC.

Group C

Ranking of second-placed teams

Semi-finals
In the semi-finals, the four teams were divided into two ties. In each tie, the two teams played each other on a home-and-away two-legged basis. The winners advanced to the final. The first legs were played on 26 and 27 April 2014, and the second legs were played on 3 May 2014.

First leg

Second leg

Amicale won 2–1 on aggregate.

Auckland City won 4–2 on aggregate.

Final

In the final, the two teams played each other on a home-and-away two-legged basis. The draw to determine the order of two legs was held on 30 April 2014 at the OFC Headquarters in Auckland, New Zealand. The first leg was played on 10 May 2014, and the second leg was played on 18 May 2014.

First leg

Second leg

Auckland City won 3–2 on aggregate.

Awards

Top goalscorers

See also
2014 FIFA Club World Cup
2014 OFC President's Cup

References

External links
OCL Preliminary Schedule & Results
OFC Champions League Schedule & Results

2013–14
1
2013–14 Ofc Champions League